The 2018 OFC Champions League qualifying stage was played from 20 to 26 January 2018. A total of four teams competed in the qualifying stage to decide two of the 16 places in the group stage of the 2018 OFC Champions League.

Draw
The draw for the qualifying stage was held on 15 September 2017 at the OFC Headquarters in Auckland, New Zealand. The champions of the four developing associations were drawn from Pot A into each of the four positions 1–4 to determine the fixtures.

Format
The four teams in the qualifying stage played each other on a round-robin basis at a centralised venue. The winners and runners-up advanced to the group stage to join the 14 direct entrants.
According to the group stage draw:
The qualifying stage winners advanced to Group A.
The qualifying stage runners-up advanced to Group D.

Schedule
Matches were played between 20 and 26 January 2018 in Pago Pago, American Samoa.
The schedule of each matchday was as follows.

Matches
All times were local, SST (UTC−11).

Notes

References

External links
OFC Champions League 2018, oceaniafootball.com

1
January 2018 sports events in Oceania
International association football competitions hosted by American Samoa